Naresh Kanodia (20 August 1943 – 27 October 2020) was an Indian Gujarati film actor, singer, musician and politician from Gujarat.

Early life
Naresh Kanodia was born on 20 August 1943 at the village of Kanoda (now in Patan district, Gujarat, India) in poor mill worker's family of Mithabhai Kanodia.

Career
He started to perform as a stage singer and dancer along with his elder brother Mahesh Kanodia. They are one of the successful musical pairs in the Gujarati film industry, known as Mahesh-Naresh. During the 1980s he and his brother were the first Gujarati pair to travel overseas and perform as stage artists in locations including Africa, America and some other Asian countries. Kanodia started his career with the film Veli Ne Avya Phool (1970). The same year he also played a minor role in the film Jigar and Ami. He has acted more than 100 Gujarati films.

Some of his popular films are Jog Sanjog, Kanku Ni Kimat, Laju Lakhan, Unchi Medina Uncha Mol, Raj Rajvan, Man Saibani Medie, Dhola Maru, Meru Malan, Maa Baap Ne Bhulsho Nahi, Rajveer. The career of Naresh Kanodia spans four decades and he has worked with many leading actresses including Snehlata, Aruna Irani, Roma Manek. Naresh Kanodia, along with Upendra Trivedi, Asrani, Kiran Kumar represent the older generation of Gujarati cinema who went on to perform in many successful movies in the 1980s and 1990s.

He had served as a member of Gujarat Legislative Assembly representing Karjan constituency from 2002 to 2007.

Sauna Hridayma Hammesh: Mahesh-Naresh, an autobiographical Gujarati book on duo was published in 2011.

Personal life
He married Ratan Kanodia and they had two sons, Hitu Kanodia and Suraj Kanodia. Hitu Kanodia is also an actor and politician. His brother Mahesh Kanodia was a Gujarati musician, singer and politician.

He died on 27 October 2020, at U. N. Mehta Institute of Cardiology and Research Centre in Ahmedabad of COVID-19 during the COVID-19 pandemic in India, two days after his elder brother Mahesh.

Selected filmography 
{{columns-list|colwidth=22em|
 Abil Gullal
 Akhand Chudalo (1980)
 Aankhaladi Tarse Piyuni Vatma
 Angne Vage Ruda Dhol
 Aanganiya Sajavo Raj
 Bap Dhamal Dikara Kamal
 Bhathiji Maharaj
 Beni Huto Barbar varse aaviyo
 Dada ne Aangan Tulasi
 Dharamo
 Dhola Maru (1983)
 Daladu Lagyu Sayba Na Desh Ma (2002)
 Didhela Kol Raj Nahi re Bhulay
 Daladu Didhu Kartakna Melama
 Daldan Lidha Chori Raj
 Dholi (1982)
 Dholi Taro Dhol Waage
 Dewana Dushman (2014)
 Dodh Dahya (1983)
 Dukhada Khame E Dikari
 Govaliyo
 Garavo Gujarati
 Hal Bheru America
 Halo Aapna Malak Man
 Hiran ne Kanthe
 Hiral Hameer
 Jay Kuber Bhandari
 Jode Rejo Raj
 Jog Sanjog
 Jugal Jodi (1982)
 Jagya Tyathi Sawaar (1981)
 Kadla Ni Jod 
 Kalajano Katako
 Khodiyar Chhe Jogmaya
 Kanku Ni Kimat (1983)
 Kanto Vagyo Kadje
 Kesar Chandan
 Ladi Lakhni Saybo Sava Lakhno
 Laju Lakhan
 Lakhtar Ni Ladi Vilayat No Var
 Lohi bhini Chundadi
 Maa Baap Ne Bhulsho Nahi
 Mane Vhalo Dikro, Dikrane Vhali Ma
 Man Saibani Medie
 Mane Rudiye Vala Bapa Sitaram
 ""Manigar Mara Malakno Marad No Mandvo (1983)
 Mara Man chhogala Dhola Mara Rudiye Rangana Tame Sajana Mare Todle Betho Mor Mari Laj Rakhje Vira  Mari Mahendi Tare Haath Mehndi Rang Lagyo Meru Malan Meru Mulande Moti Verana Chokma Narmadane Kanthe Odhu To Odhu Tari Chundadi Palavade Bandhi Preet Pankhida O Pankhida Parka Padarni Gorande Parbhav Ni Preet Paras Padamani Pardeshi Maniyaro Prem Gori Taro Kem Bhulay Preetna Sogandh Preet Gheli Radha Preet Pangre chori chori Preet Sayaba Na Bhulay Prem Gori Taro Kem Kari Bhulay Patel Ni Patelai Ane Thakor Ni Khandani (2016)
 Radhiyali Rat Radhani Badha Raj Kunvar Raj Rajvan Raj Ratna Rajveer Rudo Rabari Saubhagya Sindoor Sharadpoonamni Rat Sherne Mathe Savasher Sathiya Puravo Raj Sajan Haiye Sambhare Sajan Tara Sambharna Sant Savaiyanath Savariya Lai De Ho Rangni Chudi Samp Tya Jamp Sayba mora Sorathno Savaj Sonal Sundari Shree Nagdev Krupa Tahuke Sajan Sambhre Tana Riri Tane Parki Manu Ke Manu Potani Tamere Champo ne ame kel Tame Jitya ne Ame Harya Tejal Garasani Tu To Sajan Mara Kalje Korani Unchi Medina Uncha Mol Uncha Khoradani Khandani Ujali meraman Vanjari Vav Vagya Preetyuna Dhol Vagi Kalaje Katari Tara Premni (Guest Artist) Vat Vachan Ne Ver (1981)
 Vatno Katko Veli Ne Avya Phool Veer Bavavalo Tamere Champo ne ame ked Veer Bhathiji Maharaj Kaydo Dhantya Open (2017)
 Zoolan MoraliHindi

 Chhota Aadami (Hindi)Rajasthani

 Dharambhai (Rajasthani, Producer-Ramraj Nahta, Director -Shantilal Soni, Music-J.P. Kaushik) Dhola Maru (Rajasthani, Dubbing Of Dholamaru) Biro Hove To Aiso (Rajasthani, Dubbing Of Unchi Medina Uncha Mol)}}

Bhojpuri

 Kasam Durga maiya ke (Dubbing Of Hitu Kanodia's Gujarati film Radhani Badha)''

References

External links
 
 

Male actors from Gujarat
1943 births
2020 deaths
Deaths from the COVID-19 pandemic in India
Male actors in Gujarati-language films
Gujarat MLAs 2002–2007
Singers from Gujarat
Bharatiya Janata Party politicians from Gujarat
Indian actor-politicians
People from Patan district
Kanodia family